This page lists all manuscripts known to contain versions of the Welsh Laws first codified by Hywel Dda in the mid 10th century.

The manuscripts

Iorwerth redaction 
 Black Book of Chirk Peniarth 29
 BL Cotton Titus D II
 BL Cotton Caligula A III
 Peniarth 32 Llyfr Teg (Welsh)
 BL Add MS 14931
 Peniarth 35
 Peniarth 40
 Peniarth 39

Blegywryd redaction 
 Peniarth 38
 Jesus College Oxford, MS LVII
 BL Cotton Titus D IX
 Peniarth 33
 Peniarth 36B
 Peniarth 36A
 Peniarth 259A
 Wynnstay 36
 Peniarth 31
 BL Add MS 22356
 BL Harley MS 958
 Llanstephan 116
 Trinity College Cambridge 1329
 Llanstephan 29
 NLW ms 24029A Boston manuscript
 Peniarth 258

Cyfnerth redaction 
 Bodorgan Manuscript
 Peniarth 37
 BL Harley MS 4353
 BL Cotton Cleopatra A XIV
 BL Cotton Cleopatra B V
 NLW MS 20143A
 Peniarth 259B Pomffred manuscript

Latin texts 
 Peniarth 28
 BL Cotton Vespasian E XI 1
 BL Harley MS 1796
 Rawlinson C 821
 Corpus Christi College, Cambridge 454

Others 
 Peniarth 30  Llyfr Colan (Welsh)
 Peniarth 34 
 Peniarth 164 
 Peniarth 175 
 Peniarth 36C

See also 
 Cyfraith Hywel

References 

Legal manuscripts
Manuscripts
Law
Welsh legal scholars
Manuscripts